TTC37 (Tetratricopeptide repeat domain 37) is a protein which in humans is  encoded by gene TTC37, located on chromosome 5.

Structure 
The length of the polypeptide chain is 1,564 amino acids, and the molecular weight is 175,486 Da. TTC37 contains six tetratricopeptide repeat domains.

Function 
TTC37 is a component of the Ski complex which is involved in exosome mediated RNA decay.

Subcellular distribution 
It is localized in the cytoplasmatic space and the cell nucleus.

Clinical significance 
Mutation in the TTC37 gene are associated with tricho-hepato-enteric syndrome.

References 

 Genes on human chromosome 5
Human proteins